Vladimir Yurzinov (born February 20, 1940 in Moscow, Soviet Union) is a retired ice hockey player who played as a centre in the Soviet Hockey League. He played for HC Dynamo Moscow.  He was inducted as a player into the Russian and Soviet Hockey Hall of Fame in 1963.

After his playing career Yurzinov started coaching. He was the coach of HC TPS from 1992 to 1998 and despite Hannu Jortikka having more championships, Yurzinov is widely considered the most legendary and successful coach of TPS by the team's supporters. In 1976, he was again inducted into the Russian and Soviet Hockey Hall of Fame but this time as a builder. He received the same honor in 2002 from the IIHF Hall of Fame.

Career statistics

References

External links

1940 births
HC Dynamo Moscow players
IIHF Hall of Fame inductees
Living people
KOOVEE players
Russia men's national ice hockey team coaches
Russian ice hockey coaches
Soviet ice hockey centres
Soviet expatriate ice hockey players
Ice hockey people from Moscow